Angus MacFarlane (1843–1912) was a Scottish Roman Catholic clergyman who served as the Bishop of Dunkeld from 1901 to 1912.

Born in Spean Bridge, Lochaber, Scotland on 10 January 1843, he was ordained to the priesthood on 26 April 1868. He was Rector of St Peter's College, Partickhill from 1878 to 1880. He was Vicar general of Glasgow from 1894 to 1901. He was appointed the Bishop of the Diocese of Dunkeld  by the Holy See on 21 February 1901, and consecrated to the Episcopate on 1 May 1901. The principal consecrator was Archbishop James August Smith of St Andrews and Edinburgh, and the principal co-consecrators were Bishop William Turner of Galloway and Archbishop John Aloysius Maguire of Glasgow.

He died in office on 24 September 1912, aged 69.

References 

1843 births
1912 deaths
People from Highland (council area)
Bishops of Dunkeld (Roman Catholic, Post-Reformation)
20th-century Roman Catholic bishops in Scotland
Scottish Roman Catholic bishops